Agonopterix compacta is a moth in the family Depressariidae. It was described by Edward Meyrick in 1914. It is found in South Africa.

The wingspan is 19–20 mm. The forewings are whitish ochreous, partially tinged with brownish and with some scattered blackish specks and a blackish-grey spot on the base of the costa, its edge marked with a black dot above the middle of the wing. The hindwings are ochreous whitish, slightly tinged with grey.

References

Endemic moths of South Africa
Moths described in 1914
Agonopterix
Moths of Africa